Forest Lake is an unincorporated community and census-designated place (CDP) in Ela Township of Lake County, Illinois, United States. Per the 2020 census, the population was 1,784. The community was founded in 1935 as a vacation community for Chicago residents.

Geography
Forest Lake is located in southwestern Lake County at  (42.207824, -88.053475). It is bordered to the north, west, and south by Hawthorn Woods, and to the east and south by Kildeer. The village of Lake Zurich boundary comes within  of the southwest corner of the CDP.

Demographics

2020 census

Note: the US Census treats Hispanic/Latino as an ethnic category. This table excludes Latinos from the racial categories and assigns them to a separate category. Hispanics/Latinos can be of any race.

2010 Census
As of the census of 2010, there were 1,659 people, 662 households, and 446 families residing in the CDP. The racial makeup of the CDP in 2016 was 89.6% White, 1.0% African American, 3.6% Asian, 0.12% from other races, and 0.5% from two or more races. Hispanic or Latino of any race were 5.0% of the population. The percentage of people "foreign born" in Forest Lake is 17.4%, with 14.1% born in Europe.

There were 622 households in 2010, out of which 40.1% had children under the age of 18 living with them, 67.7% were married couples living together, 8.2% had a female householder with no husband present, and 20.9% were non-families. 14.2% of all households were made up of individuals, and 3.0% had someone living alone who was 65 years of age or older. The average household size was 2.85 and the average family size was 3.19.

In the 2000 CDP, the population was spread out, with 29.0% under the age of 18, 4.2% from 18 to 24, 34.5% from 25 to 44, 25.6% from 45 to 64, and 6.7% who were 65 years of age or older. The median age was 37 years. For every 100 females, there were 100.8 males. For every 100 females age 18 and over, there were 100.0 males.

The median income for a household in 2016 was $89,276. The 2000 CDP listed the median income for a family at $81,035. Males had a median income of $49,375 versus $36,833 for females. The per capita income for the CDP was $28,737. About 2.6% of families and 3.0% of the population were below the poverty line, including none of those under age 18 and 9.0% of those age 65 or over.

References

Census-designated places in Illinois
Unincorporated communities in Illinois
Census-designated places in Lake County, Illinois